DarkMatter was an art and activist collaboration between Janani Balasubramanian and Alok Vaid-Menon, known for their spoken word performances and queer/trans South Asian themes.

Background 

Balasubramanian and Vaid-Menon, both Indian American, met as students at Stanford University in 2009. They later joined the Stanford Slam Poetry Team and performed in spoken word venues like C.U.P.S.I. (College Unions Poetry Slam Invitational) and other college circuit slams.

The duo cite a lack of representation of South Asian poets, especially queer and/or trans South Asian poets, as an impetus for their decision to form DarkMatter and tour independently starting in 2013. Much of their poetry and activism is inspired by the lack of visibility for QTPOC (queer/trans people of color), The name DarkMatter was chosen to reflect that invisibility.

Both poets decided to finish school and move to New York, making that the center for their art and activism after their first tour in 2013. As a duo, they ran performances, workshops, and speeches for many different community groups.  In 2017, they announced they were "bringing DarkMatter to a close as a collaboration in order to dedicate ourselves wholly to our solo art practices."

Poetry 

The poets draw inspiration from various sources, including their own emotional journeys, and the perpetuation of privilege and oppression within activism. Vaid-Menon began writing poetry in middle school, focusing largely on their emotional experience and developing into more externally political themes in college; Balasubramanian entered poetry as a freshman when Vaid-Menon brought them to their first poetry slam at Stanford.

They see their performance as inherently political. One main topic that they seek to challenge is the concept of "homonationalism" and the violence and oppression done to people of color under the guise of queer activism that predominantly benefits white queers. Vaid-Menon describes this phenomenon by saying, "Rather than critiquing state violence the gay rights 'movement' has readily sought to become a part of it." 
The poets say they were drawn to spoken word and continue to create spoken word art among other forms because of the "long, deep history in black and brown communities in the U.S. as a site of resistance. It is a political form." Their  poems  bring  to  light  the perpetuation  of  privilege  and  oppression  within  queer  communities,  exposing  how  the issues  of  low-income  transgender  people  of  color  are  being  ignored.

Political work 

In addition to pursuing activism and social justice through poetry, both artists are engaged in various community organizations and projects dedicated to social justice. Vaid-Menon is the Communications and Grassroots Fundraising coordinator at the Audre Lorde Project, a queer people of color activism organization based in New York.

References

External links
Official Website

American spoken word artists
Transgender entertainers
American LGBT rights activists
Non-binary artists
Non-binary activists
Year of birth missing (living people)